New Sumgayit Stadium is a stadium that is currently under construction in Sumqayit, Azerbaijan. It will have a capacity of 10,000 spectators and will be the new home of Sumgayit FK of the Azerbaijan Premier League. The opening planned to begin in 2023. It will replace the club's current home, Kapital Bank Arena.

References

Football venues in Azerbaijan
Sport in Sumgait
Multi-purpose stadiums in Azerbaijan